The UCLA Bruins are the athletic teams that represent the University of California, Los Angeles. The Bruin men's and women's teams participate in NCAA Division I as part of the Pac-12 Conference and the Mountain Pacific Sports Federation (MPSF). For football, they are in the Football Bowl Subdivision of Division I (formerly Division I-A). UCLA is second to only Stanford University as the school with the most NCAA team championships at 120 NCAA team championships. UCLA offers 11 varsity sports programs for men and 14 for women.

UCLA is scheduled to join the Big Ten Conference with their crosstown rival, USC, in 2024.

History
Upon its founding, UCLA joined the Southern California Intercollegiate Athletic Conference (SCIAC). In 1927, UCLA left the SCIAC and joined the Pacific Coast Conference, the forerunner of the Pac-12 Conference.

Nickname and mascot 
Upon UCLA's founding as the Southern Branch of the University of California in 1919, the football team was known as the "Cubs" because of its younger relationship to the California Bears in Berkeley. In 1923, the team adopted the nickname "Grizzlies." In 1926, the Grizzlies became the 10th and final member of the Pacific Coast Conference, which already included the University of Montana Grizzlies. The school, which had taken the "University of California at Los Angeles" name that year, became the "Bruins" and has been recognized as such in the years since.

The Bruins began to use live bears as mascots in the 1930s, renting animals to appear at all UCLA home football games at the Los Angeles Memorial Coliseum. The practice grew less common until the 1950s, when students and alumni brought "Little Joe Bruin" to Westwood. A Himalayan bear cub from India, "Little Joe" grew too large and was transferred to a circus. "Josephine" was purchased by a group of alumni in 1961 and was kept in the backyard of the Rally Committee chairman. She was eventually taken to the San Diego Zoo.

A costumed mascot by the name of Joe Bruin was introduced in 1963. In 1967, the first female student to take the mascot role created Josephine "Josie" Bruin and joined Joe at athletic events. The design for the costumed bears has changed over the years, and Joe has had at least six looks over his history.

Team colors 
The UCLA athletic teams' colors are UCLA Blue and Westwood Gold. Blue symbolizes the ocean and wildflowers; yellow to reflect the Golden State, the California poppy and sunsets.

In the early days of the school, UCLA had the same colors as the University of California, Berkeley: Yale Blue and gold. When football coach Red Sanders came to UCLA for the 1949 season he redesigned the football uniforms. The Yale blue was changed to a lighter shade of blue. Sanders figured that the baby blue would look better on the field and in a film. He would dub the baby blue uniform "powder-keg blue."

In 2002, UCLA Athletics and Adidas developed a new True Blue color that was darker than powder blue. The shade was replaced in 2017 with a return to Powderkeg Blue when UCLA switched to Under Armour as its apparel provider. In 2021, Nike and the Jordan Brand aligned the athletics blue with the university's UCLA Blue hue, which has been used by the school's academic and administrative units.

Varsity sports

Baseball

The 2010 team, under head coach John Savage, won the Los Angeles Regional and Super-Regional, and was the first team to win 48 games in a season. The Bruins joined seven other teams in the 2010 College World Series and finished in second place, behind the University of South Carolina Gamecocks. The 2011 team won the Pac-10 Conference title.

The 2013 team won UCLA's 109th NCAA Championship and their first in baseball in the 2013 College World Series by beating Mississippi State 3–1 and 8–0.

Many UCLA baseball players have gone on to play in Major League Baseball (MLB). In the 2009 World Series, Chase Utley hit two home runs to help the Philadelphia Phillies win Game 1. There were a total of four former UCLA baseball players in the 2009 playoffs: Philadelphia's Ben Francisco and Chase Utley, Colorado's Garrett Atkins, and St. Louis' Troy Glaus, who was the 2002 World Series MVP for the Los Angeles Angels of Anaheim. Chris Chambliss and Gerrit Cole were No. 1 overall picks in the MLB drafts. Trevor Bauer was drafted as the No. 3 pick by the Arizona Diamondbacks on June 6, 2011. Former UCLA shortstop Brandon Crawford hit a grand-slam home run in his major-league debut with the San Francisco Giants on May 27, 2011, and helped the Giants to win the 2012 Major League World Series. Cole debuted with the Pittsburgh Pirates by winning his first four games he pitched and also drove in two runs with a single in his first at-bat in the 2013 MLB season.

Basketball (men)

Several of the most revered championships were won by the Men's Basketball team under coaches John Wooden and Jim Harrick. The rich legacy of UCLA basketball has produced 11 NCAA championships – 1964, 1965, 1967, 1968, 1969, 1970, 1971, 1972, 1973, 1975, and 1995. From 1971 to 1974, UCLA won 88 consecutive men's basketball games, an NCAA record for men. Recent UConn Huskies women's basketball teams have set overall NCAA basketball records with 90-game and (ongoing) 91-game winning streaks. The 35-year period (1940–1974) preceding and including the UCLA streak was characterized by less dynasties, however: 20 different men's teams won titles during that span. In comparison, the women's game to date has produced 35% less (tournament) parity, with 13 schools winning all 35 titles offered since its inception.

Past rosters of UCLA basketball teams have included greats such as Rafer Johnson who was the 1960 Olympic Decathlon Champion, Gail Goodrich, Kareem Abdul-Jabbar (then known as Lew Alcindor), Bill Walton, Reggie Miller and Walt Hazzard. The Bruins also had a winning record for 54 consecutive seasons from the 1948–1949 season to the 2001–2002 season.

In recent years, UCLA Men's Basketball was returned to prominence under Coach Ben Howland.  Between 2006 and 2008, UCLA has been to three consecutive Final Fours, while UCLA's players have received numerous awards, most notably Arron Afflalo, a 2007 First-Team All American and the Pac-10 Player of the Year, and Kevin Love, a 2008 First-Team All American and the Pac-10 Player of the Year. UCLA has produced the most NBA Most Valuable Player Award winners, six of them by Abdul-Jabbar and one by Walton, who was Abdul-Jabbar's successor.

In March 2013, UCLA relieved head men's basketball coach Ben Howland of his duties after UCLA dropped an 83–63 decision to Minnesota in a second-round game of the NCAA tournament.  The current head coach is Mick Cronin, former head coach at Cincinnati.

Basketball (women)

In the 1977–78 season, the women's basketball team, with a 27–2 record, were the AIAW Champions under head coach Billie Moore. The 2014–15 team won the 2015 WNIT championship by defeating the West Virginia Mountaineers 62–60 on April 4, 2015.

Women's beach volleyball
The UCLA Bruins women's beach volleyball team plays in the Pac-12 Conference. UCLA launched its beach volleyball program in 2013.

Women's National Championships: 2018, 2019
The beach volleyball team won its first national title on May 6, 2018, by defeating Hawaii and Florida State at Gulf Beach Place, Gulf Shores, Alabama. They repeated one year later on May 5, 2019, defeating rivals USC to win the National Championship.

Cross country

The UCLA Bruins men's cross country team appeared in the NCAA tournament thirteen times, with their highest finish being 5th place in the 1980–81 and 1981–82 school years. The UCLA Bruins women's cross country team appeared in the NCAA tournament eleven times, with their highest finish being 6th place in the 1985–86 school year.

Football

In 1954, the UCLA football team earned a share of the national title with a 9–0 record and a #1 ranking in the Coaches  UPI football poll, while Ohio State was ranked No. 1 in the AP Poll. Owing to rules in place at the time, UCLA was unable to face off against Ohio State in the Rose Bowl, which would have resulted in one or the other being declared national champion. The Bruins have played in the Rose Bowl Game 12 times, winning 5 of them. The Bruins have won or shared the conference title 17 times.  Among the many former UCLA football stars are Jackie Robinson (better known for his exploits as a baseball player, but nevertheless a 4-sport letterman and All-American), Heisman Trophy winner Gary Beban, Bob Waterfield, Troy Aikman, Carnell Lake, and Tommy Maddox. One of the great moments in recent history for the Bruins came on December 2, 2006, when they beat USC 13–9 in one of the greatest upsets in the rivalry. The Bruins are the Pac-12 Conference South Division Champions for two years in a row and played in both the 2011 and 2012 Pac-12 Football Championship Games.

UCLA became the first school to have a top winner in both basketball and football in the same year with Gary Beban winning the Heisman Trophy and Lew Alcindor (now Kareem Abdul-Jabbar) winning the U.S. Basketball Writers Association player of the year award in 1968.

15 football players and coaches have been inducted into the College Football Hall of Fame, John Sciarra being the latest inductee in the Class of 2014. A notable player and alumnus of the UCLA football team is current NCIS star, actor Mark Harmon. Winner of the "all-around excellence" award, Harmon led his team to victory several times as the quarterback.

The current head coach is Chip Kelly. Kelly was hired on November 25, 2017.

The UCLA Bruins men's football team have an NCAA Division I FBS Tournament record of 16–20–1 through thirty-six appearances.

Golf
The UCLA Bruins men's golf team has won two NCAA Championships, in 1988 and 2008.  In the 2008 national championship, the team was led by senior Kevin Chappell, who won the respective individual title.  In that championship, UCLA won by one shot over USC, and by two shots over Stanford. In 2009, UCLA came first in the NCAA Central Regional, pulling off their third regional championship in the last seven years. With that victory, the defending national champions, advanced to their seventh consecutive NCAA Championship, a school record. For 2011, the Bruins were first in stroke play before losing in the match play of the national championship tournament; and freshman golfer Patrick Cantlay was named GCAA Division I Jack Nicklaus National Player of the Year Award, the fourth player from UCLA. Cantlay was also the National Freshman of the Year, winning the Phil Mickelson Award in addition to being the Pac-10 Player of the Year and Freshman of the Year. Chappell won National Player of the Year in 2008, Corey Pavin in 1982 and Duffy Waldorf in 1985. At the 2011 U.S. Open, Chappell was the low American (tie with Robert Garrigus) and Cantlay was the low amateur. The team has won five Pac-12 Conference championships: 1982, 1983, 1985, 2003, 2006 and has had numerous individual conference champions the first of which was Peter Laszlo in 1970.

The women's team won the national championship in 1971 (DGWS), 1991, 2004 and 2011. In 2014, sophomore Alison Lee won the inaugural ANNIKA Award, which was created to honor the women's collegiate player of the year as chosen by a vote of coaches, college golfers, and members of the media. In 2016, junior Bronte Law won the prestigious award as well. The women's program also has many notable professional alumnae on tour, including British Open Champion Mo Martin, Sydnee Michaels, and Mariajo Uribe.

Former Bruin golf professionals include Scott McCarron, John Merrick, Corey Pavin, and Duffy Waldorf. Bruin alum Brandt Jobe tied for second at the 2011 Memorial Tournament. Maiya Tanaka, a member of the UCLA Women's Golf team from 2007 to 2009, competed with her sister Misa on The Amazing Race 20.

Gymnastics

The women's gymnastics team has won seven NCAA Women's Gymnastics championships under head coach Valorie Kondos Field, including championships in 1997, 2000, 2001, 2003, 2004, 2010, and 2018. Two NCAA Men's Gymnastics championships (1984 and 1987) were won by the men's team before the program was discontinued.

Some notable former UCLA gymnasts include current stuntwoman Heidi Moneymaker, Brian Ginsberg who was a two-time US junior national gymnastics champion, and U.S. Olympic Team members Jordan Chiles, Madison Kocian, Kyla Ross, Samantha Peszek, Jamie Dantzscher, Mohini Bhardwaj, Kate Richardson, Tasha Schwikert, Kristen Maloney, Yvonne Tousek, Stella Umeh, Luisa Portocarrero, Tim Daggett, Mitch Gaylord, and Peter Vidmar. 2008 Canadian Olympic Gymnastics team member Elyse Hopfner-Hibbs attended UCLA and was a member of the team for the 2008–2009 season. The team took home its 15th Pac-10 Gymnastics Championship on March 27, 2009.  Most recently, on April 23, 2010, the team won their 6th National Championship in Gainesville, Florida; the win brought the total number of national championships for UCLA to 105.

At the 2015 NCAA national championship, Samantha Peszek was the All Around co-champion and the balance beam champion.

At the 2018 NCAA national championship, Christine 'Peng Peng' Lee and Katelyn Ohashi won individual event titles on balance beam and floor exercise, respectively along with the team title.

Rugby Union

UCLA Bruins runs a rugby union side.

Their 7s side competed in the 2022 National Collegiate Championships.

Soccer
Men

Since the beginning of the men's soccer tournament in 1959, UCLA has won national championship in 1985, 1990, 1997, and 2002; and finished second in 1970, 1972, 1973, and 2006. The men's soccer team won the 2008 Pacific-10 Conference championship and received the conference's automatic bid in the NCAA national championship Tournament, their 26 consecutive appearances. The conference title makes it the sixth title in 9 years.

Three UCLA alumni – Frankie Hejduk, Sigi Schmid and Mike Lapper – helped the Columbus Crew to win its first-ever Major League Soccer title by defeating the New York Red Bulls 3–1 in the 2008 MLS Cup.
Cobi Jones, USA's most capped national player, played for UCLA. Also, four former Bruin players, Carlos Bocanegra, Benny Feilhaber, Jonathan Bornstein and Marvell Wynne, were on the U.S. men's national team squad that defeated No. 1 ranked Spain in the 2009 FIFA Confederations Cup semi-final.

The team was involved in the 2019 college admissions bribery scandal as head coach Jorge Salcedo was arrested, and indicted by a federal grand jury in Boston for conspiracy to commit racketeering. His indictment charged Salcedo with taking $200,000 in bribes to help two students, one in 2016 and one in 2018, get admitted to UCLA using falsified soccer credential admission information. As a result, he was placed on leave by UCLA from his coaching position at the school. On March 21, 2019, it was announced that he had resigned. On April 21, 2020, it was announced that he had agreed to plead guilty to the charges against him.

The UCLA Bruins men's soccer team have an NCAA Division I Tournament record of 74–41 through forty-five appearances.

Women

The women's soccer team has won the Pac-10 championships eight times since beginning play in 1993. It has appeared six times in the College Cup and made 12 appearances in the NCAA national championship Tournament. They finished second three times (2000, 2004, and 2005).

For the 2008 Women's Soccer Championships, the undefeated UCLA women's soccer team was named one of the four No. 1 seeds, the third time in program history. The Bruins advanced to the quarterfinals, where they defeated the Duke Blue Devils 6–1, to earn a spot in the College Cup semifinals.

During the 2011 FIFA Women's World Cup, former player Lauren Cheney played for the U.S. women's national team and scored against North Korea. She scored the first goal and assisted on the winning goal in the semi-final against France to lead the US to the finals.

The UCLA Bruins women's soccer team have an NCAA Division I Tournament record of 66–19 through twenty-two appearances.

Softball

The Bruins have been 13-time NCAA champions, including the first one in 1982. Since then, they were second 7 times in the Women's College World Series (WCWS), last one in 2005.

They won the World Series in 1978, 1982, 1984, 1985, 1988, 1989, 1990, 1992, 1999, 2003, 2004, 2010 and 2019.  The 2010 and 2019 titles were guided by head coach Kelly Inouye-Perez, a former player and assistant coach.

Former Bruin Natasha Watley went on to help the United States women's national softball team win a gold medal in the 2004 Olympics and a silver medal in 2008.  Andrea Duran helped Team USA win a gold medal at the 2006 ISF World championship and a silver medal at the 2008 Olympics. Other famous Bruin players include Lisa Fernandez (two time NCAA Champion and three time Olympic gold medalist) and Dot Richardson (NCAA Champion [1982] and Olympic medal winner).

Swimming and diving
UCLA's Men's Swim Team won 41 individual national championships, a team championship in 1982, had a runner-up finish in ’81, and sent 16 alumni to the Olympics. Although the men's team was cut in 1994, the women's team currently trains at Spieker Aquatics Center under head coach Jordan Wolfrum.

Tennis
The only school to have competed in every NCAA Men's Tennis Tournament, the team has won 16 national championships and 37 Pac-12 conference titles. Coach Billy Martin, who played at UCLA, has a 14 straight top 5 NCAA team finishes and a 9 consecutive 20-win seasons. He was named ITA (Intercollegiate Tennis Association) division 1 National Coach of the Year and is a member of ITA Hall of Fame. The 1950 men's tennis team won UCLA's first-ever NCAA Championship. Anita Kanter won the US girls tennis championship in 1951 as an 18-year-old sophomore at UCLA, as well as the 1951 National Hard Court Doubles and Mixed Doubles championships.

In 2014, Marcos Giron became the school's 11th NCAA Men's Tennis Singles Champion, joining Jack Tidball (1933), Herbert Flam (1950), Larry Nagler (1960), Allen Fox (1961), Arthur Ashe (1965), Charles Pasarell (1966), Jeff Borowiak (1970), Jimmy Connors (1971), Billy Martin (1975), and Benjamin Kohllöffel (2006). Mackenzie McDonald claimed the school's 12th individual singles championship and the school's 12th doubles individual championship when he teamed with Martin Redlicki at the 2016 tournament. On May 28, 2018, Redlicki teamed with Evan Zhu for the school's 13th doubles championship.

The women's team, which won national championships in 1981 (AIAW), 2008 and 2014, is coached by Stella Sampras the sister of Pete Sampras, who donated a scholarship at UCLA. Number of players have won the individual titles, including Keri Phebus (1995 Singles), Heather Ludloff and Lynn Lewis (1982 Doubles), Allison Cooper and Stella Sampras (1988 Doubles), Mamie Ceniza and Iwalani McCalla (1992 Doubles), Keri Phebus and Susie Starrett (1995 Doubles), Daniela Bercek and Lauren Fisher (2004 Doubles), and Tracy Lin and Riza Zalameda (2008 Doubles).

On May 25, 2019, the Bruins took both the men's and women's NCAA tennis doubles championships with Gabby Andrews and Ayan Broomfield the women's champions, and Maxime Cressy and Keegan Smith the men's champions.

UCLA alumni in the ATP included Jimmy Connors, Arthur Ashe, Eliot Teltscher, Brian Teacher, Peter Fleming, Fritz Buehning, Jeff Borowiak, and Jean-Julien Rojer.

Inducted into the Intercollegiate Tennis Association (ITA) Hall of Fame: 

Arthur Ashe (1983 – P)
J. D. Morgan (1983 – P)
William C. Ackerman (1984 – C)
Jimmy Connors (1986 – P)
Herbert Flam (1987 – P)
Allen Fox (1988 – P/C)
Frank Stewart (1992 – Con.)
Jack Tidball (1992 – P)
Glenn Bassett (1993 – C)
Billy Martin (1996 – P)
Ian Crookenden (1997 – P)
Robert M. Perry (1997 – P)
Peter Fleming (1998 – P)
Brian Teacher (2001 – P)
Larry Nagler (2004 – P)
Jeff Borowiak (2006 – P)
Ferdi Taygan (2006 – P)
Jim Pugh (2008 – P)
Brad Pearce (2009 – P)
Roy Barth (2019 - P)
(P – Player, C – Coach, Con. – Contributor)

Track and field
 Men's Championships: 1956, 1966, 1971, 1972, 1973, 1978, 1987, 1988
 Women's Championships: 1975 (Outdoor), 1977 (Outdoor), 1982 (Outdoor), 1983 (Outdoor), 2000 (Indoor), 2001 (Indoor), 2004 (Outdoor)
The UCLA-USC Dual Meet Hall of Fame inducted Willie Banks (triple-jump), John Brenner (shot put), Wayne Collett (sprints) and Seilala Sua (shot put and discus) into the hall's first class in 2009.

Other notable team members are: Rafer Johnson, Dwight Stones, C. K. Yang.

When Meb Keflezighi was running for UCLA, he won four NCAA championships in one year, including the cross-country title, the 10,000 meters outdoors and the 5,000 meters indoors and outdoors titles in track. At the 2004 Olympics in Athens, Greece, Meb ran to a second-place finish and winning the silver medal in the marathon with a then personal-best time of 2:11.29. In 2009, he became the first American to win the New York City Marathon in 17 years. At the 2014 Boston Marathon, he became the first American to win the men's race since 1983 with the time of 2:08.37. He paid tribute to the victims of the Boston Marathon bombing by writing their names on his running bib.

Volleyball

 Men's National Championships: 1953, 1954, 1956, 1965, 1967, 1970, 1971, 1972, 1974, 1975, 1976, 1979, 1981, 1982, 1983, 1984, 1987, 1989, 1993, 1995, 1996, 1998, 2000, 2006

The UCLA men's team won 19 NCAA titles, all under Al Scates, who coached the Bruins for 48 years. The Bruins also won 5 USVBA titles prior to the sport being sanctioned by the NCAA, two of these under Scates. John Speraw became head coach of the men's program following the retirement of Scates in 2012. Former player Karch Kiraly (1983) was inducted into the College Sports Information Directors of America (COSIDA) Academic All-America Hall of Fame.

 Women's National Championships: 1972, 1974, 1975, 1984, 1990, 1991, 2011

Andy Banachowski led UCLA to six national championships (3 NCAA-1984, 1990, 1991; 2 AIAW-1974, 1975; and 1 DGWS-1972). The women's team played in 6 DGWS/AIAW championship games, has made 12 NCAA Final Four appearances, and has won 4 NCAA titles. Most recently, the women's team defeated Illinois to claim the 2011 NCAA title, twenty years after their previous title run.

The UCLA Bruins women's volleyball team have an NCAA Division I Tournament record of 90–32 through thirty-five appearances.

Water polo
The women's team has captured 7 of the championships since it became an NCAA sponsored event. They also won non-NCAA national titles in 1996, 1997, 1998 and 2000. The men's team were champions 9 times and as runner-up 9 times.

Four UCLA water polo alumni and former coach Guy Baker were members of the USA women's and men's teams participated in the 2008 Beijing Olympics. Natalie Golda (now Benson) and Jaime Hipp were members of the women's team, while Adam Wright and Brandon Brooks were on the men's team. Both teams won a silver medal.

Sean Kern, Coralie Simmons, Natalie Golda, Kelly Rulon, Kelly Kathleen Hall and Courtney Mathewson won many prestigious individual award in American collegiate water polo.

Peter J. Cutino Award winners: Sean Kern, Garrett Danner, Nicolas Saveljic, Coralie Simmons, Natalie Golda, Kelly Rulon, and Courtney Mathewson.

The then No. 2-ranked men's water polo team opened the newest athletic facility at UCLA, the Spieker Aquatics Center, with a win over the No. 7-ranked UC Irvine Anteaters, 10–4, on Saturday, September 26, 2009. The center hosted the MPSF Women's Water Polo Championship Tournament April 30 – May 2, 2010 and the MPSF Men's Water Polo Championship Tournament November 25–27, 2011.

In 2009, the men's team defeated #1 ranked USC and #3 ranked California for the MPSF tournament championship to advance to the NCAA Men's Water Polo Championship. On February 28, 2010, the women's team played the longest match in NCAA women's water polo history, winning 7–6 over California at the UC Irvine Invitational.

On December 7, 2014, the men's team defeated 3rd-seed USC 9–8 to win its ninth NCAA national championship at UC San Diego's Canyonview Aquatic Center at La Jolla, California.

On December 6, 2015, the men's team once again defeated USC, 10–7, to win back-to-back NCAA championships and finish with a perfect season at 30–0 on the UCLA campus. Outstanding goalkeeper and MPSF Player of the Year Garrett Danner won the prestigious Cutino Award, the second Bruin to do so.

On October 9, 2016, the men's team defeated UC Davis to set an NCAA record of 52 straight wins.

On October 22, 2016, the men's team defeated the Cal Bears to improve their NCAA record to 54 straight wins.

On December 3, 2017, the men's team defeated rival Southern California, 7–5, to capture their third National Championship in four years. The win also pulled the Bruins even with fellow PAC-12 school Stanford University for the most NCAA team championships in school history, both schools with 114 each. Earlier in the day, the Cardinal had pulled ahead when their women's soccer team defeated the Bruins' women's team 3–2. The lead lasted less than six hours. Stanford, subsequently won their 115th NCAA team championship, in men's soccer.

On March 21, 2021, the men's team defeated Southern California, 7–6, in the national championship game to win the men's program's twelfth title.

The UCLA Bruins men's water polo team have an NCAA Division I Tournament record of 63–27 through thirty-five appearances.

USA Water Polo Hall of Fame 
 Natalie Golda Benson, 2015
 Rich Corso, a former UCLA swimming and water polo coach, 2015

Championships

Summary

As of December 5, 2022, UCLA has won 120 NCAA team championships, second to Stanford's 131. The totals do not include any football championships at the FBS level.

UCLA secured three NCAA championships during the month of May 2008: on May 11 when UCLA defeated archrival USC, 6–3, for the Women's Water Polo Championship, on May 20 when the Bruins defeated California for the Women's Tennis Championship, and on May 31 when UCLA defeated archrivals Stanford and USC for the Men's Golf Championship.

Appearances

The UCLA Bruins competed in the NCAA tournament across 25 active sports (11 men's and 14 women's) 768 times at the Division I FBS level.

 Baseball (23): 1969, 1979, 1986, 1987, 1990, 1992, 1993, 1996, 1997, 1999, 2000, 2004, 2006, 2007, 2008, 2010, 2011, 2012, 2013, 2015, 2017, 2018, 2019
 Men's basketball (49): 1950, 1952, 1956, 1962, 1963, 1964, 1965, 1967, 1968, 1969, 1970, 1971, 1972, 1973, 1974, 1975, 1976, 1977, 1978, 1979, 1980, 1981, 1983, 1987, 1989, 1990, 1991, 1992, 1993, 1994, 1995, 1996, 1997, 1998, 1999, 2000, 2001, 2002, 2005, 2006, 2007, 2008, 2009, 2011, 2013, 2014, 2015, 2017, 2018
 Women's basketball (16): 1983, 1985, 1990, 1992, 1998, 1999, 2000, 2004, 2006, 2010, 2011, 2013, 2016, 2017, 2018, 2019
 Beach volleyball (4): 2016, 2017, 2018, 2019
 Men's cross country (13): 1979, 1980, 1981, 1982, 1983, 1985, 2006, 2008, 2012, 2014, 2015, 2016, 2017
 Women's cross country (11): 1985, 1986, 1988, 1998, 1999, 2001, 2002, 2003, 2004, 2014, 2016
 Football (36): 1942, 1946, 1953, 1955, 1961, 1965, 1975, 1976, 1978, 1981, 1982, 1983, 1984, 1985, 1986, 1987, 1988, 1991, 1993, 1995, 1997, 1998, 2000, 2002, 2003, 2004, 2005, 2006, 2007, 2009, 2011, 2012, 2013, 2014, 2015, 2017
 Men's golf (38): 1948, 1949, 1950, 1960, 1963, 1964, 1965, 1966, 1967, 1978, 1979, 1980, 1982, 1983, 1984, 1985, 1987, 1988, 1989, 1991, 1993, 1997, 1998, 2001, 2003, 2004, 2005, 2006, 2007, 2008, 2009, 2010, 2011, 2012, 2013, 2014, 2015, 2018
 Women's golf (31): 1982, 1985, 1986, 1987, 1988, 1990, 1991, 1992, 1993, 1994, 1995, 1996, 1997, 2001, 2002, 2003, 2004, 2005, 2006, 2007, 2008, 2009, 2010, 2011, 2012, 2013, 2014, 2015, 2016, 2018, 2019
 Women's gymnastics (36): 1982, 1983, 1984, 1986, 1987, 1988, 1989, 1990, 1992, 1993, 1994, 1995, 1996, 1997, 1998, 1999, 2000, 2001, 2002, 2003, 2004, 2005, 2006, 2007, 2008, 2009, 2010, 2011, 2012, 2013, 2014, 2015, 2016, 2017, 2018, 2019
 Rowing (4): 2010, 2012, 2013, 2014
 Men's soccer (45): 1968, 1970, 1971, 1972, 1973, 1974, 1975, 1976, 1977, 1980, 1983, 1984, 1985, 1986, 1987, 1988, 1989, 1990, 1991, 1992, 1993, 1994, 1995, 1996, 1997, 1998, 1999, 2000, 2001, 2002, 2003, 2004, 2005, 2006, 2007, 2008, 2009, 2010, 2011, 2012, 2013, 2014, 2015, 2016, 2018
 Women's soccer (23): 1995, 1997, 1998, 1999, 2000, 2001, 2002, 2003, 2004, 2005, 2006, 2007, 2008, 2009, 2010, 2011, 2012, 2013, 2014, 2016, 2017, 2018, 2019, 2022
 Softball (36): 1982, 1983, 1984, 1985, 1987, 1988, 1989, 1990, 1991, 1992, 1993, 1994, 1995, 1996, 1997, 1999, 2000, 2001, 2002, 2003, 2004, 2005, 2006, 2007, 2008, 2009, 2010, 2011, 2012, 2013, 2014, 2015, 2016, 2017, 2018, 2019
 Women's swimming and diving (38): 1982, 1983, 1984, 1985, 1986, 1987, 1988, 1989, 1990, 1991, 1992, 1993, 1994, 1995, 1996, 1997, 1998, 1999, 2000, 2001, 2002, 2003, 2004, 2005, 2006, 2007, 2008, 2009, 2010, 2011, 2012, 2013, 2014, 2015, 2016, 2017, 2018, 2019
 Men's tennis (42): 1977, 1978, 1979, 1980, 1981, 1982, 1983, 1984, 1985, 1986, 1987, 1988, 1989, 1990, 1991, 1992, 1993, 1994, 1995, 1996, 1997, 1998, 1999, 2000, 2001, 2002, 2003, 2004, 2005, 2006, 2007, 2008, 2009, 2010, 2011, 2012, 2013, 2014, 2015, 2016, 2017, 2018, 2019, 2021
 Women's tennis (37): 1982, 1983, 1984, 1985, 1986, 1987, 1988, 1989, 1990, 1991, 1992, 1993, 1994, 1995, 1996, 1997, 1998, 1999, 2000, 2001, 2002, 2003, 2004, 2005, 2006, 2007, 2008, 2009, 2010, 2011, 2012, 2013, 2014, 2015, 2016, 2017, 2018, 2019, 2021
 Men's indoor track and field (29): 1978, 1988, 1989, 1990, 1991, 1993, 1994, 1995, 1996, 1997, 1998, 1999, 2000, 2001, 2003, 2004, 2005, 2006, 2008, 2009, 2010, 2011, 2012, 2013, 2014, 2015, 2016, 2017, 2019
 Women's indoor track and field (27): 1990, 1991, 1992, 1993, 1994, 1995, 1996, 1997, 1998, 1999, 2000, 2001, 2002, 2003, 2004, 2005, 2006, 2007, 2008, 2009, 2010, 2012, 2013, 2014, 2015, 2018, 2019
 Men's outdoor track and field (76): 1934, 1935, 1937, 1938, 1939, 1940, 1941, 1942, 1946, 1947, 1948, 1949, 1950, 1951, 1952, 1953, 1955, 1956, 1960, 1961, 1962, 1963, 1964, 1965, 1966, 1967, 1968, 1969, 1970, 1971, 1972, 1973, 1974, 1975, 1976, 1977, 1978, 1979, 1980, 1981, 1982, 1983, 1984, 1985, 1986, 1987, 1988, 1989, 1990, 1991, 1992, 1993, 1994, 1995, 1996, 1997, 1998, 1999, 2000, 2001, 2002, 2003, 2004, 2005, 2006, 2007, 2008, 2010, 2011, 2012, 2013, 2014, 2016, 2017, 2018, 2019
 Women's outdoor track and field (35): 1982, 1983, 1984, 1985, 1986, 1987, 1988, 1989, 1990, 1991, 1992, 1993, 1994, 1995, 1996, 1997, 1998, 1999, 2000, 2001, 2002, 2003, 2004, 2005, 2006, 2007, 2008, 2009, 2010, 2011, 2012, 2013, 2014, 2018, 2019
 Men's volleyball (27): 1970, 1971, 1972, 1974, 1975, 1976, 1978, 1979, 1980, 1981, 1982, 1983, 1984, 1987, 1989, 1993, 1994, 1995, 1996, 1997, 1998, 2000, 2001, 2005, 2006, 2016, 2018
 Women's volleyball (36): 1981, 1982, 1983, 1984, 1985, 1986, 1987, 1988, 1989, 1990, 1991, 1992, 1993, 1994, 1995, 1997, 1998, 1999, 2000, 2001, 2002, 2003, 2004, 2005, 2006, 2007, 2008, 2009, 2010, 2011, 2012, 2014, 2015, 2016, 2017, 2019
 Men's water polo (35): 1969, 1970, 1971, 1972, 1973, 1974, 1975, 1976, 1979, 1981, 1982, 1983, 1984, 1985, 1986, 1987, 1988, 1990, 1991, 1994, 1995, 1996, 1999, 2000, 2001, 2004, 2009, 2011, 2012, 2014, 2015, 2016, 2017, 2018, 2020
 Women's water polo (17): 2001, 2002, 2003, 2005, 2006, 2007, 2008, 2009, 2010, 2011, 2012, 2013, 2014, 2015, 2016, 2017, 2018, 2019

Team

UCLA has won 120 NCAA championships at the Division I level.

Men's (76)
 Baseball (1): 2013
 Basketball (11): 1964, 1965, 1967, 1968, 1969, 1970, 1971, 1972, 1973, 1975, 1995
 Golf (2): 1998, 2008
 Gymnastics (2): 1984, 1987
 Outdoor track and field (8): 1956, 1966, 1971, 1972, 1973, 1978, 1987, 1988
 Soccer (4): 1985, 1990, 1997, 2002
 Swimming and diving (1): 1982
 Tennis (16): 1950, 1952, 1953, 1954, 1956, 1960, 1961, 1965, 1970, 1971, 1975, 1976, 1979, 1982, 1984, 2005
 Volleyball (19): 1970, 1971, 1972, 1974, 1975, 1976, 1979, 1981, 1982, 1983, 1984, 1987, 1989, 1993, 1995, 1996, 1998, 2000, 2006
 Water polo (12): 1969, 1971, 1972, 1995, 1996, 1999, 2000, 2004, 2014, 2015, 2017, 2020
Women's (44)
 Beach volleyball (2): 2018, 2019
 Golf (3): 1991, 2004, 2011
 Gymnastics (7): 1997, 2000, 2001, 2003, 2004, 2010, 2018
 Indoor track and field (2): 2000, 2001
 Outdoor track and field (3): 1982, 1983, 2004
 Soccer (2): 2013, 2022
 Softball (12): 1982, 1984, 1985, 1988, 1989, 1990, 1992, 1995 (vacated), 1999, 2003, 2004, 2010, 2019
 Tennis (2): 2008, 2014
 Volleyball (4): 1984, 1990, 1991, 2011
 Water polo (7): 2001, 2003, 2005, 2006, 2007, 2008, 2009

Results

† The football championship is not an official NCAA championship.

Below are eleven national championships that were not bestowed by the NCAA:

 Women's badminton (1): 1977 (AIAW)
 Women's basketball (1): 1978 (AIAW)
 Women's golf (1): 1971 (AIAW)
 Women's soccer (1): 1980 (AIAW)
 Softball (1): 1978 (AIAW)
 Women's tennis (1): 1981 (AIAW)
 Women's outdoor track and field (2): 1975, 1977 (AIAW)
 Women's volleyball (3): 1971, 1974, 1975 (AIAW)

Below are twenty-four national club team championships:

 Co-ed archery (1): 2015 (USA Archery)
 Men's archery (1): 2015 (USA Archery)
 Women's archery (4): 1930, 1931, 1932, 2015 (USA Archery)
 Men's badminton (3): 1977, 1981, 1982 (ABA)
 Women's badminton (1): 1977 (ABA)
 Co-ed sailing (1): 1978 (ICSA)
 Men's team handball: 1979 (United States Team Handball Federation, highest adult division in 1979)
 Co-ed tennis (1): 2011 (USTA)
 Men's tennis (7): 1984, 1991, 1993, 1996, 1997, 1999, 2001 (ITA)
 Women's tennis (1): 2012 (ITA)
 Women's triathlon (3): 2014, 2015, 2016 (USA Triathlon)

Individual

UCLA had 273 Bruins win NCAA individual championships at the Division I level.

Notable non-varsity sports

Badminton
The UCLA varsity men's badminton team won three national championships in 1977, 1981 and 1982. The 1977 squad was led by Chris Kinard, multiple winner of the U.S. Men's Singles Championship before and during his career at UCLA. Kinard is a member of the U.S. Badminton Hall of Fame.

The women's varsity badminton team also won the AIAW intercollegiate championship in 1977.

Boxing
The men's and women's boxing teams have competed as part of the National Collegiate Boxing Association since 2016, after switching from the United States Intercollegiate Boxing Association. The women's team has earned three individual national boxing titles: one from the USIBA in 2014, and two from the NCBA, in 2016 and 2019.

Ice Hockey

Rugby
Founded in 1934, UCLA rugby is one of the historically great college rugby teams. UCLA won 3 national championships, and amassed a 362–46–2 record from 1966 to 1982, but the program lost its varsity status in 1982. The Bruins play Division 1 college rugby in the PAC Rugby Conference. The Bruins are led by head coach Scott Stewart, who formerly played international rugby for Canada. The team plays its home games at North Athletic Field.

UCLA rugby has been steadily improving in recent years. UCLA finished the 2010–11 season ranked 25th in the country. In the 2011–12 season UCLA placed second in the Pacific Conference, reached the quarterfinals of the 2012 men's national playoffs, and finished the season ranked 11th in the nation. During the 2012–13 season, UCLA finished second in the PAC conference, highlighted by a 50–38 win over 6th-ranked Utah, which propelled UCLA into a top-10 position in the national rankings. UCLA – along with fellow PAC schools Cal and Utah – was one of the original eight teams to form the Varsity Cup, which began play in 2013. UCLA reached the quarterfinals of the 2015 Varsity Cup, before losing to eventual champions BYU.

UCLA has also been successful in rugby sevens. UCLA reached the quarterfinals of the 2012 Las Vegas Invitational college rugby sevens tournament. UCLA defeated Arizona State to finish third at the 2012 PAC 7s tournament. UCLA defeated Dartmouth to reach the semifinals of the 2013 Collegiate Rugby Championship at PPL Park in Philadelphia in a tournament broadcast live on NBC. UCLA again reached the semifinals of the 2014 Collegiate Rugby Championship, before losing, 17–20, to eventual champions Cal. UCLA won the 2014 West Coast 7s with a 14–12 upset victory over Cal in the final.

Athletics facilities
In 2014, UCLA named all of its recreation and athletics facilities in honor of Jackie Robinson, who was a four-sport  student-athlete at the school and went on to play Major League Baseball as the first African American to do so in the league. The Jackie Robinson "42" Athletics and Recreation Complex monument was installed in front of the John Wooden Recreation Center and was unveiled on March 5, 2016. The school also retired number 42 which was the number Robinson worn as a member of the Brooklyn Dodgers.

Two notable sports facilities serve as home venues for UCLA sports. Since 1982, the Bruin football team has played home games at the Rose Bowl in Pasadena, California.  From 1923 to 1981, including the Bruins' 1954 National Championship year, the team played at the Los Angeles Memorial Coliseum in Los Angeles. The men's and women's basketball, women's gymnastics and volleyball teams play at Pauley Pavilion on campus. The softball team plays on campus at Easton Stadium. Down the hill, the water polo teams, as well as the swim and dive teams, compete at Spieker Aquatics Center. For baseball, there is the Steele Field at Jackie Robinson Stadium, located close to campus.

See also: Bel-Air Country Club, Drake Stadium, Los Angeles Tennis Center, Sunset Canyon Recreation Center, UCLA Marina Aquatic Center, Wallis Annenberg Stadium

Athletic alumni

Mark Harmon, Lynn "Buck" Compton, Jackie Robinson, Rafer Johnson, Walt Hazzard, Gail Goodrich, Troy Aikman, Gary Beban, Kenny Easley, Tom Fears, Billy Kilmer, Bob Waterfield, Jimmy Connors, Lonzo Ball, Kareem Abdul-Jabbar (Lew Alcindor), Jamaal Wilkes, Jackie Joyner-Kersee, Evelyn Ashford, Bill Walton, Kenny Washington, Arthur Ashe, Reggie Miller,  Troy Glaus, Tim Daggett, Baron Davis, Stacey Nuveman, Lisa Fernandez, Amanda Freed, Kevin Love, Tairia Flowers, Donna de Varona, Russell Westbrook, Cobi Jones, Lauren Cheney, Sydney Leroux and Ann Meyers are just some of the notable athletic alumni, many of whom have achieved success in other fields.

Former coaches have included Red Sanders, Tommy Prothro, Dick Vermeil, Terry Donahue, Al Scates, Adam Krikorian, Jonathan Bornstein, Andy Banachowski, Jim Harrick, and John Wooden.

Olympic competitors
In addition to the success of its collegiate sports program, UCLA has been represented at the Olympics. In the 2004 Athens games, UCLA sent 56 athletes, more than any other university in the country. At the 2008 Beijing Olympic Games, Bruins won 15 medals, including 4 gold, 9 silver, and 2 bronze. Additionally, five coaches came from UCLA: Jill Ellis (women's soccer, gold), Guy Baker (women's water polo, silver), Bob Alejo (men's beach volleyball, gold), Jeannette Boldon (women's track and field, multiple medals), and John Speraw (men's volleyball, gold).

Symbolism
The Bruin mascots are Joe and Josephine Bruin. In addition to regular attendance at UCLA sporting events, the duo participates in other events for the university.

On September 30, 1984, the UCLA Alumni Association celebrated its 50th anniversary by installing "The Bruin" statue in Bruin Plaza. It was billed as the largest bear sculpture in the United States, at 10 feet long, 6 feet wide, 3 feet across and weighing more than 2 tons.

The Solid Gold Sound of the UCLA Bruin Marching Band entertains crowds at major athletic and extracurricular events. The school fight songs are "Sons of Westwood" and "The Mighty Bruins." The spirit squad includes the cheer squad, the dance team and the yell crew, in addition to the mascots. The UCLA alumni band is the official band of the gymnastics team at the school.

Rivalries

UCLA shares a traditional sports rivalry with the nearby University of Southern California (USC). This rivalry is relatively unique in NCAA Division I sports because both schools are located within the same city, Los Angeles. The Lexus Gauntlet was the name given to a now defunct competition between UCLA and USC in the 18 varsity sports that both competed in head-to-head; in 2003, 2005, and 2007 UCLA won the Lexus Gauntlet Trophy, while the University of Southern California won the trophy in 2002, 2004, 2006, 2008, and 2009. Competitions with official sponsorship were held from 2001 until the licensing contract ended in 2009. The annual football game features both teams vying for the Victory Bell.

California and UCLA have met annually on the football field since 1939. Because UCLA was founded as the southern branch of the University of California, the series takes on the quality of a sibling rivalry. The series was dominated early by Cal, followed by dominance by UCLA in the 1950s until 80s, and has become more evenly matched recently.

UCLA had a basketball rivalry with Notre Dame, with games played every year from 1966 to 1995. After UCLA's victory on February 7, 2009, UCLA leads the all-time series, 28–19.
The performance of UCLA and Arizona influences the national opinion of the conference.

UCLA Athletics Hall of Fame
In conjunction with the opening of the J.D. Morgan Athletics Center in November 1983, UCLA established an athletics Hall of Fame with 25 charter members representing a cross-section of the school's athletic history.  Each year, a minimum of one and a maximum of eight former UCLA athletes, coaches or administrators are added to the Hall of Fame.  Upon its 23rd year of existence, The Hall of Fame was moved to a new location facing Westwood Plaza. The new Hall of Fame is now double in size after its renovation and expansion, which was completed in the Winter of 2000. The first floor in the east wing of the new J.D. Morgan Athletics Center features the  Athletics Hall of Fame and serves as the main entrance to the Department of Intercollegiate Athletics.

1984 (25 charter members): Bill Ackerman, athletic director; Lew Alcindor (Kareem Abdul-Jabbar), basketball; Arthur Ashe, tennis; Gary Beban, football; Mike Burton, swimming; Paul Cameron, football; Chris Chambliss, baseball; Elvin 'Ducky' Drake, track coach and trainer; Gail Goodrich, basketball; Walt Hazzard (Mahdi Abdul-Rahman), basketball; Cecil Hollingsworth, football scout and gymnastics and wrestling coach; Rafer Johnson, track; Kirk Kilgour, volleyball; Billy Kilmer, football; Donn Moomaw, football; J.D. Morgan, athletic director and tennis coach; Jackie Robinson, football, baseball, basketball and track; Henry 'Red' Sanders, football coach; Al Sparlis, football; Bill Spaulding, football coach; Bill Walton, basketball; Kenny Washington, football; Bob Waterfield, football; Keith (Jamaal) Wilkes, basketball; and John Wooden, basketball coach.

1985 (6): Bob Davenport, football; Craig Dixon, track; Wilbur Johns, athletic director/basketball coach; Tommy Prothro, football coach; George Stanich, basketball; and Sidney Wicks, basketball.

1986 (8): Kermit Alexander, football; Burr Baldwin, football; Keith Erickson, basketball; Mike Frankovich, football; Jimmy LuValle, track; Willie Naulls, basketball; Jerry Norman, basketball player and assistant coach; and Don Paul, football.

1987 (8): Don Barksdale, basketball; George Dickerson, football; Jack Ellena, football; Bert LaBrucherie, football; Dick Linthicum, basketball; Jim Salsbury, football; John Smith, track; Jack Tidball, tennis.

1988 (6): Sam Balter, basketball; Mel Farr Sr., football; Robert Fischer, athletic director; Marques Johnson, basketball; Ann Meyers, basketball; and C.K. Yang, track.

1989 (7): Peter H. Dailey, football; Tom Fears, football; Vic Kelley, sports information director, Carl McBain, track; Karen Moe-Thornton, swimming; Ernie Suwara, volleyball; and Pat Turner, track.

1990 (7): Evelyn Ashford, track; Dr. Bobby Brown, baseball; Stan Cole, water polo; Denny Crum, basketball; Norm Duncan, football/administration; Mike Marienthal, football/special service; Mike Warren, basketball.

1991 (7): Willie Banks, track; Kenny Easley, football; Brian Goodell, swimming; Briggs Hunt, wrestling; Tim Leary, baseball; Jerry Robinson, football; Christopher "Sinjin" Smith, volleyball.

1992 (9): Wayne Collett, track; Terry Condon, volleyball; Jim Johnson, football; Robin Leamy, swimming; Freeman McNeil, football; Dave Meyers, basketball; Jack Myers, baseball; Corey Pavin, golf; Woody Strode, football.

1993 (8): Sue Enquist, softball; Greg Foster, track; Maurice (Mac) Goodstein, football; Charles "Karch" Kiraly, volleyball; Jose Lopez, soccer; Don Manning, football; Bill Putnam, basketball; Curtis Rowe, basketball.

1994 (7): Donald Bragg, basketball; Denise Curry, basketball; John Richardson, football; Larry Rundle, volleyball; John Sciarra, football; Kiki Vandeweghe, basketball; Peter Vidmar, gymnastics.

1995 (8): Jimmy Connors, tennis; Debbie Doom, softball; Mitch Gaylord, gymnastics; Ricci Luyties, volleyball; Stephen Pate, golf; John Peterson, football/track; Jerry Shipkey, football; Mike Tully, track.

1996 (7): Bill Barrett, swimming; Jackie Joyner-Kersee, track; Liz Masakayan, volleyball; Eddie Merrins, golf coach; Dot Richardson, softball; Skip Rowland, football; Dick Wallen, football.

1997 (8): Jim Bush, track coach; Paul Caligiuri, soccer; Tim Daggett, gymnastics; David Greenwood, basketball; Frank Lubin, basketball; Doug Partie, volleyball; Cal Rossi, football/baseball; Charles Young, chancellor.

1998 (12): Glenn Bassett, tennis coach; Sheila Cornell, softball; Randy Cross, football; Gaston Green, football; Florence Griffith-Joyner, track; Tom Jager, swimming; Eric Karros, baseball; Reggie Miller, basketball; Ken Norton, Jr., football; Tom Ramsey, football; Art Reichle, baseball coach; Cy Young, track.

1999 (12): Troy Aikman, football; Sam Boghosian, football; Kay Cockerill, golf; Tracy Compton, softball; Denise Corlett, volleyball/basketball; Dave Dalby, football; Gail Devers, track; Bob Horn, water polo; Ernie Johnson, football; Torey Lovullo, baseball; Sharon Shapiro, gymnastics; Kevin Young, track.

2000 (10): Lucius Allen, basketball; Jeanne Beauprey-Reeves, volleyball; John Brenner, track and field; George Farmer, football; Kim Hamilton, gymnastics; Carnell Lake, football; Billie Moore, basketball; Steve Salmons, volleyball; Eddie Sheldrake, basketball; Dick Vermeil, football.

2001 (11): Jill Andrews, gymnastics; Sharron Backus, softball; Jim Brown, football; Charles Cheshire, football; Gary Cunningham, basketball; Terry Donahue, football; Warren Edmonson, track and field; John Green, basketball; John Lee, football; Lisa Longaker, softball; and Ozzie Volstad, volleyball.

2002 (9): Denny Cline, volleyball; Bob Day, track and field; Cobi Jones, soccer; Don MacLean, basketball; Shane Mack, baseball; Ted Narleski, football; Anita Ortega, basketball; Duffy Waldorf, golf; Russell Webb, water polo/swimming.

2003 (8): Danny Everett, track and field; Lisa Fernandez, softball; Brad Friedel, soccer; Ryan McGuire, baseball; Jerome "Pooh" Richardson, basketball; Don Rogers, football; Al Scates, volleyball; Tim Wrightman, football.

2004 (8): Henry Bibby, basketball; Dennis Dummit, football; Carlton Gray, football; Steve Lewis, track & field; James Owens, football/track & field; Sigi Schmid, soccer; Fred Slaughter, basketball; Natalie Williams, basketball/volleyball.

2005 (8): Hardiman Cureton, football; Dawn Dumble, track & field; Allen Fox, tennis; John Godina, track & field; Ed O'Bannon, basketball; Mike O'Hara, volleyball; Art Shurlock, gymnastics; Kenneth Washington, basketball.

2006 (8): Carol Bower, rowing; Herb Flam, tennis; Monte Nitzkowski, swimming/water polo; Jonathan Ogden, football/track and field; Annette Salmeen, swimming; Dennis Storer, soccer/rugby; John Vallely, basketball; Elaine Youngs, volleyball.

2007 (8): Amy Acuff, track & field; George Brown, track & field; Jennifer Brundage, softball; Jim Ferguson, water polo; Troy Glaus, baseball; John Moore, basketball; Jeff Nygaard, volleyball; Keri Phebus, tennis

2008 (8): Traci Arkenberg, Soccer; Peter T. Dalis, Athletic Director/Administration; Kurt Krumpholz, Water Polo/Swimming; Leah Homma, Gymnastics; Robert Seaman, Track & Field; Jackie Tobian-Steinmann, Women's Golf Coach; Eric Turner, Football; Todd Zeile, Baseball

2009 (8): Tyus Edney, basketball; James "Cap" Haralson, football/track & field; Cade McNown, football; Stein Metzger, volleyball; Nicolle Payne, water polo; J.J. Stokes, football; Daiva Tomkus, volleyball; Walt Torrence, basketball

2010 (8): David Ashleigh, men's water polo; Andy Banachowski, women's volleyball coach; Judith Holland, administration; Mebrahtom Keflezighi, men's track & field; Valorie Kondos Field, women's gymnastics coach; Seilala Sua, women's track & field; Chase Utley, baseball; and Catherine Von Schwarz, women's water polo.

2011 (8): Gary Adams, baseball; Ato Boldon, track & field; Theotis Brown, football; Ernie Case, football; Larry Nagler, tennis; Mel North, fencing; Alex Rousseau, water polo; and Janeene Vickers-McKinney, track & field.

2012 (9): Ron Ballatore, men's swimming coach; Dr. Julie Bremner Romias, women's volleyball; Jack Hirsch, men's basketball; Fred McNeill, football; Stacey Nuveman, softball; Charles Pasarell, men's tennis; Coralie Simmons, women's water polo; Stella Umeh, gymnastics; and Dr. Gerald Finerman, team doctor

2013 (8): Mohini Bhardwaj, gymnastics; Carlos Bocanegra, men's soccer; Fred Bohna, wrestling; Eric Byrnes, baseball; Yvonne Gutierrez, softball; Don Johnson, men's basketball; Maylana Martin Douglas, women's basketball; Nandi Pryce, women's soccer

2014 (8): Guy Baker (water polo), James Butts (men's track & field), Joanna Hayes (women's track & field), Joe-Max Moore (men's soccer), Francis Wai (football, basketball, track & field, rugby), Natasha Watley (softball), and Onnie Willis (women's gymnastics)

2015 (8):  Annett Buckner Davis (volleyball), Danny Farmer (football/volleyball), Billy Martin (men's tennis), Paul Nihipali (men's volleyball), Jan Palchikoff (women's rowing/swimming & diving), Janice Parks (softball), Eric Valent (baseball) and Richard Washington (men's basketball)

2016 (8): Julie Adams (softball), Jamie Dantzscher (women's gymnastics), Baron Davis (men's basketball), Natalie Golda (women's water polo), Chris Henderson (men's soccer), Adam Krikorian (water polo), Mike Marsh (track & field) and Wendell Tyler (football)

2017 (9): Toby Bailey (men's basketball), Robin Beauregard (women's water polo), Monique Henderson (track & field), Maurice Jones-Drew (football), Bob Larsen (track & field/cross country coach), Kristen Maloney (gymnastics), Brandon Taliaferro (men's volleyball), Gina Vecchione (softball), and Bobby Field (football, administration)

2018 (8): Nikki Blue (women's basketball), Kevin Chappell (men's golf), Lynn "Buck" Compton (baseball/football), Larry Farmer (men's basketball), Amanda Freed (softball), Jenny Johnson Jordan (women's volleyball), Eric Lindroth (men's water polo),and Stella Sampras Webster (women's tennis)

2019 (7): Jill Ellis (women's soccer), Peter Fleming (men's tennis), Tairia Flowers (softball), Skip Hicks (football), Courtney Mathewson (women's water polo), Adam Naeve (men's volleyball), Kristee Porter (women's volleyball, basketball, track & field)

2020 (9): Keira Goerl (softball), Lauren (Cheney) Holiday (women’s soccer), Kevin Love (men’s basketball), Mike Powell (track and field), Noelle Quinn (women’s basketball), Dave Roberts (baseball), Tasha Schwikert (gymnastics), Russell Westbrook (men’s basketball), Adam Wright (men’s water polo)

2021 (8): Jeanette Bolden (track & field), Tiffany Joh (women's golf), Megan Langenfeld (softball), Marcedes Lewis (football), Tracy Murray (men's basketball), Keiko Price (women's swimming & diving), Kate Richardson (gymnastics)

2022 (9): Patrick Cantlay (men's golf), Gerrit Cole (baseball), DeShaun Foster (football), Dawn Harper-Nelson (track & field), Kelly Inouye-Perez (softball), Ole Mikkelsen (men's soccer), Linda Robertson Hanley (women's beach volleyball), Dave Saunders (men's volleyball), Ed Kezirian (extraordinary service)

Athletics apparel sponsorships 
From 1993 to 1999, the school had an apparel contract with Reebok.

In 1999, an agreement was reached with Adidas for six years, ending in June 2005. The deal was to provide equipment and apparel to UCLA's 21 intercollegiate teams. Additional terms of the deal included internship opportunities for UCLA students and an exclusive licensee for athletic replica wear. The reported monetary terms of the agreement included $1.625 million in cash and $1.3 million in equipment each year.

In 2005, the deal was renewed for $2.6 million in cash and $1.6 million in equipment. Additional terms included one full-time Adidas employee on the UCLA campus, $2,500 each year for a "non-UCLA charitable" project selected by the Football or Basketball head coach, game tickets for Adidas executives, radio acknowledgements during games, and appearances by the Football and Basketball head coaches at Adidas events.

In April 2010, a letter of intent to renew was reached between UCLA Athletics and Adidas. By June of that same year the terms of the deal were finalized but not published. In a report, UCLA Athletic Director Dan Guerrero stated that the deal is for seven years and "will approach" the deal Adidas has with Michigan worth $7.5 million.

In May 2016, UCLA signed a 15-year, $280 million deal with sportswear manufacturer Under Armour starting in the 2017–18 season. In June 2020, Under Armour announced that it will be terminating its apparel deal with UCLA.

In December 2020, UCLA signed a 6-year deal with the Jordan Brand to outfit the football and men's and women's basketball teams. Starting July 1, 2021, Nike also outfits the other 25 varsity sports teams at UCLA.

 1993-1999 Reebok
 1999-2017 Adidas
 2017-2021 Under Armour
 2021-Future Jordan and Nike

See also
2019 college admissions bribery scandal

References

External links